Tobore Ovuorie is a Nigerian journalist, health editor and senior investigative journalist with the Premium Times

Biography 
Ovuorie published her first book at the age of sixteen. She embarked on an undercover investigation titled Inside Nigeria’s Ruthless Human trafficking Mafia  in 2013 which was published by Premium Times in 2014.

Ovuorie demanded $5,000,000 (about N225million) from EbonyLife films for publishing a film titled Oloture without giving her credit. She claimed that the film was a depiction of her experience in Inside Nigeria’s Ruthless Human trafficking Mafia.  The film production company owner Mo Abudu stated that the movie was a work of fiction and was inspired by a variety of true events. The statement also added that the movie Oloture was informed and developed after an in-depth consultation with several entities with diverse accounts of human and sex trafficking.

Awards 
She is a recipient of the 2021 Deutsche Welle (DW) Freedom of Speech Award.

References 

Nigerian journalists
Investigative journalists
Living people
Year of birth missing (living people)